Alereon, Inc, is a fabless semiconductor company. It uses ultrawideband (UWB) radio technology to develop Certified Wireless USB and WiMedia Alliance-compliant UWB integrated circuits (ICs). Headquartered in Austin, Texas, Alereon also has offices in Korea and Hong Kong. Alereon was spun off from Time Domain Corporation of Huntsville, Alabama, in August 2003 taking with it a number of engineers, executives, and patents from its parent company. An early investor was Austin Ventures.

It initially backed the multi-band orthogonal frequency-division multiplexing approach taken by the MultiBand OFDM Alliance.
A number of competing technologies were discussed by the IEEE 802.15 standards committee in 2004.
In October 2005,  $20 million in financing included investors Centennial Ventures and Pharos Capital. After the IEEE effort was abandoned, the venture arm of Samsung Electronics invested $4 million in December 2006. By 2009, Eric Brookman was still chief executive. In June 2012, an addition $6 million of funding was announced with investors Pharos Capital Partners and Duchossois Technology Partners and led by Enhanced Capital Partners.

References

External links 

Electronics companies established in 2003
Fabless semiconductor companies
2003 establishments in Texas
Semiconductor companies of the United States